The men's 4 x 100 metres relay at the 1954 European Athletics Championships was held in Bern, Switzerland, at Stadion Neufeld on 27 and 29 August 1954.

Medalists

Results

Final
29 August

Heats
27 August

Heat 1

Heat 2

Heat 3

Participation
According to an unofficial count, 56 athletes from 14 countries participated in the event.

 (4)
 (4)
 (4)
 (4)
 (4)
 (4)
 (4)
 (4)
 (4)
 (4)
 (4)
 (4)
 (4)
 (4)

References

4 x 100 metres relay
Relays at the European Athletics Championships